KTFY (88.1 FM) is a radio station broadcasting a Christian contemporary format. Licensed to Buhl, Idaho, United States, the station serves the Twin Falls (Sun Valley) area. The station is currently owned by Idaho Conference of Seventh-Day Adventists, Inc.

History
The station was assigned the calls KTFY on 1998-10-06.

References

External links
KTFY's website

TFY